Zhou Xia (born ) is a Chinese para-athlete who competes in sprint events. She won two gold medals at the 2016 Summer Paralympics, in the T35 100 m and 200 m races. At the 2020 Summer Paralympics, she won two gold medals in the T35 100m race and T35 200m, setting a new world record in both event.

Career
Zhou competed at the 2016 Summer Paralympics in Rio de Janeiro, when she was 17 years old. She won the T35 100 m (ahead of Australia's Isis Holt and Britain's Maria Lyle) and set a Paralympics record for the event with a time of 13.66s. She also won gold in the T35 200 m event with a world record time of 28.22s.

Zhou competed in the IPC Athletics World Championships in London in 2014. She won the silver medal in both the 100 m and 200 m events, behind Isis Holt.

Zhou competed in the 2020 Summer Paralympics in Tokyo. She won the T35 100 m in a world record time of 13.00s. She also won the T35 200 m in a world record time of 27.17s.

References

External links
 Xia Zhou at International Paralympic Committee

Paralympic athletes of China
Paralympic gold medalists for China
Year of birth missing (living people)
Living people
Paralympic medalists in athletics (track and field)
Athletes (track and field) at the 2016 Summer Paralympics
Athletes (track and field) at the 2020 Summer Paralympics
Medalists at the 2016 Summer Paralympics
Medalists at the 2020 Summer Paralympics
21st-century Chinese women